is a village located in Nagano Prefecture, Japan. , the village had an estimated population of 755 in 350 households, and a population density of 13 persons per km².

Geography
Kitaaiki is located in mountainous eastern Nagano Prefecture, bordered by Gunma Prefecture to the east. More than 90% of the village area is covered by mountains and forest. Mount Ogura (2,112 meters) is the highest point in the village.

Surrounding municipalities
 Nagano Prefecture
 Koumi
 Sakuho
 Minamiaiki
 Gunma Prefecture
 Ueno

Climate
The village has a humid continental climate characterized by hot and humid summers, and cold winters (Köppen climate classification Dfb).  The average annual temperature in Kitaaiki is 7.5 °C. The average annual rainfall is 1513 mm with September as the wettest month. The temperatures are highest on average in August, at around 20.2 °C, and lowest in January, at around −4.7 °C.

Demographics 
Per Japanese census data, the population of Kitaaiki has decreased over the past 70 years and is now less than a third of what it was in 1950.

History
The area of present-day Kataaiki was part of ancient Shinano Province, and was mentioned in Muromachi period records. The present village of Kitaaiki was created with the establishment of the modern municipalities system on April 1, 1889.

Education
Kitaaiki has one public elementary school operated by the village government. The village shares a public middle school with neighboring Minamiaika. The village does not have a high school.

Transportation

Railway
The village does not have any passenger rail service.

Highway
The village is not served by any national highways

Local attractions
Tochibaraiwakage ruins, a Jomon period National Historic Site

References

External links

Official Website 

 
Villages in Nagano Prefecture